Disques Vogue was a jazz record company founded in France by Léon Cabat and Charles Delaunay in 1947, the year after the American Vogue label ceased.

They originally specialized in jazz, featuring American performers such as Sidney Bechet, Dizzy Gillespie, and Gigi Gryce (sessions reissued on CD under Clifford Brown's name), in addition to local musicians Django Reinhardt and Martial Solal. In the late 1950s Vogue expanded into pop music, recording artists such as Petula Clark. In the 1960s and early 1970s the label added Jacques Dutronc and Françoise Hardy. They licensed recordings by ABBA for release in Belgium and France and European distribution of Recordings of Monsieur Tranquille.

Vogue Records, a British offshoot, was founded in 1951 and absorbed by English Decca (then separate from the American company) around 1956, but the rights to the name reverted to the French parent in 1962, whereupon Decca renamed its Vogue label Vocalion. A new Disques Vogue sister label was established in Britain as part of the Pye Group. The label's catalogue is now part of Sony Music.

See also
 List of record labels

References

1947 establishments in France
French record labels
Jazz record labels
Pop record labels
Record labels established in 1947